Otha Birkner (November 19, 1924 – May 30, 2018) was an American politician who served in the Texas House of Representatives from 1963 to 1967.

He died on May 30, 2018, in Bandera, Texas at age 93.

References

1924 births
2018 deaths
Democratic Party members of the Texas House of Representatives